Calcitonin receptor-like (CALCRL), also known as the calcitonin receptor-like receptor (CRLR), is a human protein; it is a receptor for calcitonin gene-related peptide.

Function 
The protein encoded by the CALCRL gene is a G protein-coupled receptor related to the calcitonin receptor. CALCRL is linked to one of three single transmembrane domain receptor activity-modifying proteins (RAMPs) that are essential for functional activity.

The association of CALCRL with different RAMP proteins produces different receptors:
 with RAMP1: produces a CGRP receptor
 with RAMP2: produces an adrenomedullin (AM) receptor, designated AM1
 with RAMP3: produces a dual CGRP/AM receptor designated AM2

These receptors are linked to the G protein Gs, which activates adenylate cyclase and activation results in the generation of intracellular cyclic adenosine monophosphate (cAMP).

CGRP receptors are found throughout the body, suggesting that the protein may modulate a variety of physiological functions in all major systems (e.g., respiratory, endocrine, gastrointestinal, immune, and cardiovascular).

Wounds
In wounds, CGRP receptors found in nerve cells deactivate the immune system, to prevent collateral damage in case of a clean wound (common case).  In very preliminary research, nerve blockers like e.g. lidocaine or botox have been demonstrated to block CGRP cascade, thereby allowing immune system involvement and control of pathogens, resulting in complete control and recovery.

Structure 

CALCRL associated with RAMP1 produces the CGRP receptor which is a trans-membrane protein receptor that is made up of four chains.  Two of the four chains contain unique sequences. It is a heterodimer protein composed of two polypeptide chains differing in composition of their amino acid residues. The sequence reveals multiple hydrophobic and hydrophilic regions throughout the four chains in the protein.

The CGRP family of receptors including CALCRL can couple to G-protein Gαs, Gαi and Gαq subunits to transduce their signals.  Furthermore binding of ligands to CALCRL can bias coupling to these G-protein. Peptide agonist bind to the extracellular loops of CALCRL.  This binding in turn causes TM5 (transmembrane helix 5) and TM6 to pivot around TM3 which in turn facilitates Gαs binding.

Adrenomedullin receptor

Expression
The RNA expression charts show a high level in fetal lung.

Clinical significance 
Calcitonin gene-related peptide receptor antagonists are approved for the treatment of migraine.

References

Further reading

External links 
 
 
 
 

G protein-coupled receptors